Bloody Twilight is a 1959 Greek drama film directed by Andreas Labrinos. It was entered into the 1959 Cannes Film Festival.

Cast
 Efi Oikonomou as Dina Wistavsen
 Spiros Focás as Giannos
 Tzavalas Karousos
 Andreas Zisimatos
 Mihalis Kalogiannis
 Kakia Analyti as Hryso
 Kostas Rigopoulos

References

External links

1959 films
1950s Greek-language films
1959 drama films
Greek black-and-white films
Greek drama films